Gabriele Muccino (born 20 May 1967) is an Italian film director. He has worked his way from making short films only aired on Italian television to become a well-known and successful American filmmaker. He is the elder brother of actor Silvio Muccino, who often appears in his brother's films. Muccino has directed 12 films and is best known for his first American film The Pursuit of Happyness, starring Will Smith. Muccino has been nominated for and won several awards including the David di Donatello Award for Best Director in 2001 for his film The Last Kiss.

Life and career
Born in Rome, Gabriele Muccino started his studies at Sapienza University of Rome in Italian literature but dropped out of  University to pursue a career as a director. His first on-set film experience was as a volunteer director's assistant. This inspired his passion for filmmaking and led him to take courses in screenwriting and enroll in a directing program at Rome's Experimental Cinematography Institute. While there, Muccino created a few short films that were aired on Italian television. He then began directing a number of documentaries.

Following these accomplishments, Muccino was given  the opportunity to direct a segment of the Italian anthology film Intolerance (1996). But Forever in My Mind was the next film he directed, starring his younger brother Silvio. Muccino's third feature film, The Last Kiss, directed in 2001, was the breakthrough that brought him international attention. The film's success led to Muccino signing a two-picture deal with Miramax. His success continued to grow with his next film, Remember Me, My Love in 2003.

He has currently made the switch to directing Hollywood films after The Last Kiss won the Audience Award for World Cinema at the 2002 Sundance Film Festival bringing him to the attention of the American film industry. Muccino was personally chosen by Will Smith to serve as the director of The Pursuit of Happyness. Muccino said in an interview afterwards, "Will had to defend me as a choice to the studio; I could barely speak English and could barely express my vision. I felt protected and that I could push my ideas even when they weren't totally conventional. The reason I found respect, and respect for my ideas, was because of Will." Muccino also directed Smith's later film Seven Pounds. Playing for Keeps was his next major work, starring Gerard Butler, Dennis Quaid and Uma Thurman. Muccino's next film Fathers and Daughters also features A-list celebrities such as Amanda Seyfried, Russell Crowe, and Aaron Paul.

One of his latest movies, Summertime, is a coming of age story of two Italian teenagers traveling to the States for the first time during the summer between high school and college.

Awards and nominations
Muccino has won several awards throughout his lifetime. The first being Best Film at the Torino International Festival of Young Cinema in 1998 for Ecco fatto. In 1999 his film But Forever in My Mind won him several awards including the Silver Iris at the Brussels International Film Festival for best film, the Golden Castle at the Castellinaria International Festival of Young Cinema, and the OCIC Award at the Buenos Aires International Festival of Independent Cinema. The Italian box office success The Last Kiss (2001) won Muccino Best Director and Best Screenplay at the David di Donatello Awards. This film also earned the Audience Award in 2002 at the Sundance Festival which introduced Muccino to the United States. Remember Me, My Love scored three Nastro d'Argento Prizes which are the Italian equivalent to the Oscars. This film also won Best Director, Best Film, and Best Screenplay at the Donatello Awards in 2003.
 Torino International Festival of Young Cinema: Best Film (1998)
 Brussels International Film Festival: Best Film (1999)
 Castellinaria International Festival of Young Cinema: Golden Castle (1999)
 Buenos Aires International Festival of Independent Cinema: OCIC Award (1999)
 David Di Donatello Award 2001: Best Director and Best Screenplay - The Last Kiss
 Sundance Festival 2002: Audience Award - The Last Kiss
 David Di Donatello Awards 2003: Nominated ad Best Director, Best Film, and Best Screenplay for Remember Me, My Love
 Shanghai Film Festival 2010: Kiss Me Again - Won as Best film

Filmography
Ecco fatto (1998)
But Forever in My Mind (1999)
The Last Kiss (2001)
Remember Me, My Love (2003)
The Pursuit of Happyness (2006)
Seven Pounds (2008)
Kiss Me Again (2010)
Playing for Keeps (2012)
Fathers and Daughters (2015)
Summertime (2016)
There's No Place Like Home (2018)
The Best Years (2020)

References

Coyote, S. (2006). Filmed Entirely In San Francisco, Pursuit of Happyness To Premiere As A Benefit For Glide Foundation. Retrieved 1 January 2007, from 
https://www.variety.com/article/VR1117997301.html?categoryid=3482&cs=1

External links

1967 births
Living people
Italian film producers
Film directors from Rome
David di Donatello winners
Ciak d'oro winners
Nastro d'Argento winners